Mohammad Tahir Dar (born 17 March 1975) is a cricketer who plays for the Bahrain national cricket team. He played in the 2013 ICC World Cricket League Division Six tournament. He made his Twenty20 International (T20I) debut for Bahrain against Saudi Arabia on 20 January 2019 in Oman in the 2019 ACC Western Region T20 tournament.

References

External links
 

1975 births
Living people
Bahraini cricketers
Bahrain Twenty20 International cricketers
Pakistani expatriate sportspeople in Bahrain
Place of birth missing (living people)